Sentul may refer to:

Plants
 Sandoricum koetjape, a tropical fruit grown in Southeast Asia

In Indonesia
 Sentul, Indonesia
 Sentul International Circuit, a motor racing circuit

In Malaysia
Sentul, Kuala Lumpur, a suburb
 Sentul Komuter station
 Sentul LRT station
 Sentul Timur LRT station
Sentul Barat MRT station